Kantang railway station is a railway station in Kantang Subdistrict, Kantang District, Trang. Its building has not been renovated, and has its original wood designs. It is separated into two parts, the main building, and the verandah (platform). Both are painted mustard yellow lined in dark brown, a unique feature of the station. It contains Love Station, an air-conditioned coffee shop with a photogenically popular exterior. Kantang Station's architecture has been preserved and registered under the Fine Arts Department. A formerly modern-style passenger train, permanently exhibited behind the normal tracks, can be seen from the station building and as one approaches by road.

This station opened in April 1913 for the Southern Line section Huai Yot–Kantang, initially as Trang railway station. The line was extended about 500 metres to Kantang Port so cargo from international trade with Singapore, Malaysia and Indonesia could be transported by rail. That section ceased operations in the 1960s and was dismantled.

Train services 
 Rapid train No. 167 / 168 Krung Thep Aphiwat – Kantang – Krung Thep Aphiwat

References 
 
 
 
 
 

Railway stations in Thailand
Railway stations opened in 1913
1913 establishments in Siam